Waber is a surname. Notable people with the surname include:

Bernard Waber (1921–2013), American writer
Bernhard Waber (1884–1945), German Air Force officer
Christian Waber (born 1948), Swiss politician